WPPC (1570 AM) is a radio station broadcasting a Religious format in Peñuelas, Puerto Rico. The station is currently owned by Ponce Gospel Broadcasting, and its license is held by Radio Felicidad, Inc.

Translator stations

External links

PPC
Radio stations established in 1976
Peñuelas, Puerto Rico
1976 establishments in Puerto Rico